José Azueta Abad (May 2, 1895 – May 10, 1914), usually known as José Azueta, was a Mexican Navy lieutenant who became famous for his role in the United States occupation of Veracruz, where he was fatally wounded. He is one of the most revered national heroes in Veracruz.

Early life and education
Born in Guerrero on May 2, 1895, son to Commodore Manuel Azueta Perillos and Josefa Abad. Due to the labor of his father in military service, the family moved to the port of Veracruz. There he completed basic education in José Miguel Macías of Veracruz School where he showed quick progress especially at discipline and behavior. At age 11, his father was promoted to Captain of the ship to the Director of the Naval Academy, at that time, Jose showed his interest and affection for the profession of his father, and in 1909 he began taking classes at the Navy school.

The son of Commodore Manuel Azueta, commander of the Veracruz Naval Academy, Lieutenant Azueta was wounded on April 21, 1914, the first day of the invasion.

Career
Azueta was manning a machine gun placed outside the building, facing the incoming U.S. troops on his own and causing a number of casualties. After having been mortally wounded by U.S. Navy marksman Joseph G. Harner, who took several shots at him from about 300 yards away, he was rescued from the battlefield and taken to his home.

After the battle, U.S. Rear Admiral (later  Admiral) Frank Friday Fletcher heard of Azueta's actions and sent word to him via messenger that he (Fletcher) wished to visit the fallen defender and pay his respects. Azueta—through his surgeon and local political activist Dr. Roberto Reyes Barreiro—sent word to Fletcher refusing the visit, saying "If the American (Fletcher) enters my house, I will either kill him or myself." Fletcher then offered to send his personal doctor to take care of him. However, Azueta refused medical services offered by the occupation army and only allowed local Dr. Rafael Cuervo Xicoy to treat him. Dr. Xicoy lacked medical supplies to assist Azueta properly. At the time of his death, Lt. Azueta was being cared for by the surgeon Reyes Barreiro. Fletcher has never been credited for his unusual offer of medical care for a wounded enemy who had caused injuries and casualties to the American servicemen. 

On April 24, Lieutenant Azueta was promoted immediately to captain by the President of the Republic  for his performance in combat. On April 29, he was awarded a gold medal with the Decoration of the Second U.S. Invasion. Again on May 1, he was issued the 3rd Class Military Merit medal.

Azueta died of his wounds on May 10, Mexico's Mother's Day. During his funeral hundreds of citizens marched holding his coffin on their shoulders to the city's cemetery in open defiance to directives from the occupation army forbidding assembly.

Legacy

The municipalities of José Azueta, Guerrero, and José Azueta, Veracruz, were named after him.

Notes

External links
Biography from the Mexican Government 
Spanish Wikipedia 

Mexican soldiers
Mexican people of Basque descent
People of the Mexican Revolution
People from Acapulco
Military personnel from Guerrero
1914 deaths
1895 births
Mexican military personnel killed in action